İsmet İnönü Boulevard (a.k.a. Eskişehir Boulevard) is a busy boulevard in Ankara, Turkey. The boulevard is named after İsmet İnönü, the second president of Turkey and one of the pioneers of the Turkish War of Independence.

Geography
The easternmost point of the boulevard is at  where it intersects Atatürk Boulevard.

Main Buildings
Ankara being the capital of Turkey, has many governmental offices most of which are around İsmet İnönü Boulevard. For example, Grand National Assembly of Turkey, Ministry of Energy and Natural Sources, Ministry of Foreign Affairs, Turkish Court of Accounts, are at the south side of the boulevard. Ministry of Interior, Ministry of Economy, General Directorate of Highways, State Hydraulic Works, Turkish Statistical Institute and National Library of Turkey are at the north side.

Traffic density
In addition to offices in the İsmet İnönü Boulevard  there are also some universities such as Middle East Technical University and Bilkent University, some shopping malls, neighborhoods and newly established office buildings around D-200 further to west. Thus the traffic density on İsmet İnönü Boulevard is very high. To ease the traffic flow the municipality of Ankara established a series of four underpasses in the course. These underpasses are useful especially for the side street connections. Another recent facility is  M2, a new line of Ankara Metro.

References

Streets in Ankara
Çankaya, Ankara
Transportation in Ankara